Parliamentary elections were held in Greece on 25 September 1932. All 250 seats in the Lower House of the Greek Parliament, the Chamber of Deputies, were elected, as well as one-third of the seats in the Senate. The outcome was an ambivalent result for the two biggest parties,  the Liberal Party of Eleftherios Venizelos and the People's Party. The People's Party received a plurality of votes in the Chamber of Deputies elections, but won fewer seats than the Liberal Party. The Liberals also won the most seats in the Senate.

These were the last elections for the Senate, as it was abolished in 1935.

Results

Chamber of Deputies

Senate

References

Parliamentary elections in Greece
Greece
Legislative election
1930s in Greek politics
Election 1932
History of Greece (1924–1941)
Greece
Election and referendum articles with incomplete results
Legl